Supply and Demand: Songs by Brecht / Weill & Eisler is the first solo album by German singer Dagmar Krause released by Hannibal Records in 1986. It is a collection of 16 songs by German composers Kurt Weill and Hanns Eisler, with lyrics by Bertolt Brecht and sung by Krause in English. She also sang the songs in the original German which were released by Hannibal at the same time on a companion album, Angebot & Nachfrage: Lieder von Brecht / Weill & Eisler.

Supply and Demand was reissued by Voiceprint Records in 1999 with track selections from both the English and German editions.

Track listings

Supply and Demand
"Supply & Demand (The Trader's Song)" (Brecht, Eisler) – 2:57
"Epitaph 1919" (Brecht, Weill) – 1:59
"German Miserere" (Brecht, Eisler) – 1:39
"O Falladah, Die du Hangest!" (Brecht, Eisler) – 2:41
"Alabama Song" (Brecht, Weill) – 2:51
"Hollywood Elegies" (Brecht, Eisler) – 2:55
"This City Has Made Me Realise"
"You Find Gold"
"I Saw Many Friends"
"Surabaya Johnny" (Brecht, Weill) – 3:59
"Moritat (Ballade von Mackie Messer)" (Brecht, Weill) – 2:39
"Matrosen-Tango" (Brecht, Weill) – 3:57
"Lily of Hell" (Brecht, Weill) – 2:25
"Song of the Moldau" (Brecht, Eisler) – 1:40
"Pavel's Prison Song" (Brecht, Eisler) – 3:00
"Easter Sunday 1935" (Brecht, Eisler) – 1:24
"At Potsdam 'Unter den Eichen'" (Brecht, Weill) – 2:22
"Der Song von Mandelay" (Brecht, Weill) – 2:12
"Benares Song" (Brecht, Weill) – 3:52

Angebot & Nachfrage
"Angebot & Nachfrage (Song von der Ware)" (Brecht, Eisler) – 2:57
"Grabrede 1919" (Brecht, Weill) – 1:59
"Deutsche Miserere" (Brecht, Eisler) – 1:39
"O Falladah, Die du Hangest!" (Brecht, Eisler) – 2:41
"Alabama-Song" (Brecht, Weill) – 2:51
"Hollywood-Elegien" (Brecht, Eisler) – 2:55
"Surabaya Johnny" (Brecht, Weill) – 3:59
"Moritat (Ballade von Mackie Messer)" (Brecht, Weill) – 2:39
"Matrosen-Tango" (Brecht, Weill) – 3:57
"Die Ballade von der Höllenlili" (Brecht, Weill) – 2:25
"Das Lied von der Moldau" (Brecht, Eisler) – 1:40
"Im Gefängnis Zu Singen" (Brecht, Eisler) – 3:00
"Ostersonntag 1935" (Brecht, Eisler) – 1:24
"Zu Potsdam Unter den Eichen" (Brecht, Weill) – 2:22
"Der Song Von Mandelay" (Brecht, Weill) – 2:12
"Benares Song" (Brecht, Weill) – 3:52

Supply and Demand (reissue)
"Song von der Ware (Supply & Demand)" (Brecht, Eisler) – 2:57
"Grabrede 1919 (Epitaph 1919)" (Brecht, Weill) – 1:59
"Deutsche Miserere (German Miserere)" (Brecht, Eisler) – 1:39
"O Faladah, Die du Hangest!" (Brecht, Eisler) – 2:41
"Alabama Song" (Brecht, Weill) – 2:51
"Hollywood Elegies" (Brecht, Eisler) – 2:56
"This City Has Made Me Realise"
"You Find Gold"
"I Saw Many Friends"
"Surabaya Johnny" (Brecht, Weill) – 3:59
"Moritat (Ballade Von Mackie Messer)" (Brecht, Weill) – 2:39
"Barbara Song" (Brecht, Weill) – 4:02
"Kannonensong (Cannon Song)" (Brecht, Weill) – 2:15
"Matrosen-Tango" (Brecht, Weill) – 3:57
"Die Ballade von der Höllenlili (Lily of Hell)" (Brecht, Weill) – 2:25
"Das Lied von der Moldau (Song of the Moldau)" (Brecht, Eisler) – 1:40
"Im Gefängnis Zu Singen" (Brecht, Eisler) – 3:00
"Ostersonntag 1935 (Easter Sunday 1935)" (Brecht, Eisler) – 1:24
"Zu Potsdam Unter den Eichen (At Potsdam 'Unter den Eichen')" (Brecht, Weill) – 2:22
"Der Song von Mandelay (Mandelay Song)" (Brecht, Weill) – 2:12
"Benares-Song" (Brecht, Weill) – 3:52
"Supply & Demand" (Brecht, Eisler) – 2:57
"Epitaph 1919" (Brecht, Weill) – 1:59
"German Miserere" (Brecht, Eisler) – 1:39
"Surabaya Johnny" (Brecht, Weill) – 3:59
"The Song of the Moldau" (Brecht, Eisler) – 1:40
"Pavel's Prison Song" (Brecht, Eisler) – 3:00
"Easter Sunday 1935" (Brecht, Eisler) – 1:24
"At Potsdam 'Unter den Eichen'" (Brecht, Weill) – 2:22

Personnel
Dagmar Krause – vocals
Jack Emblow – accordion
Richard Thompson – acoustic guitar, guitar, banjo
Danny Thompson – bass guitar
David Newby – cello
Joe Gallivan – percussion
Jason Osborn – piano
John Harle – alto and soprano saxophone, clarinet, bass clarinet
Andy Findon – alto, tenor and soprano saxophone, clarinet
Paul 'Wix' Wickens – synthesizer
Roger Williams – trombone, tuba
Howard Evans – trumpet
Adrian Levine – violin

References

External links
.
.

1986 debut albums
Albums produced by Joe Boyd
Hannibal Records albums